Florida is a town, with a population of 6,384 (2013 census), and a municipality in the western Honduran department of Copán.

Its products include tobacco, corn and cattle.

The feria patronal, or fair in honor of the town's patron saint, is towards the end of April when one may enjoy aubades, carreras de cintas, climbing greased poles, the coronation of the queen of the fair, rodeos, sack races, and so forth.

References 

Municipalities of the Copán Department